Party Manners is a comedy play by the British writer Val Gielgud. A political farce it was described in one review as "domestic comedy touched-up with witticism some good, some feeble, about the Labour Party government".

It originally premiered at the Opera House, Buxton on 22 August 1949. It later transferred to the Princes Theatre in London's West End where it ran for 48 performances between 31 October and 9 December 1950. The West End cast included Raymond Lovell, Jill Esmond, Terence Alexander, Michael Horden, George Merritt, Brown Derby and Diana Calderwood.

References

Bibliography
 Wearing, J.P. The London Stage 1950-1959: A Calendar of Productions, Performers, and Personnel.  Rowman & Littlefield, 2014.

1949 plays
British plays
West End plays
Comedy plays
Plays set in London